State Route 144 (SR 144) is a state highway in the U.S. state of California that runs through the Sycamore Canyon in Santa Barbara. It travels along Sycamore Canyon Road from its intersection with Alameda Padre Serra at the Five Points Roundabout to Stanwood Drive (State Route 192).

Route description
Route 144 begins at a roundabout called the Five Points Roundabout. From the roundabout, Route 144 continues north onto Sycamore Canyon Road, a winding two-lane road between steep hillsides to its terminus with State Route 192/Stanwood Drive.

The highway used to begin at U.S. Route 101's interchange with Milpas Street. From there, SR 144 headed northwest on Milpas, a conventional 4-lane thoroughfare. In less than four blocks, however, the route then turned northeast on Mason Street, a two-lane residential street, passing by an elementary school and through a narrow bridge crossing the Sycamore Creek. Mason Street ends at Salinas Street; at this intersection, the route turned northwest onto Salinas Street, another two-lane street, until it reached the Five Points Roundabout. This portion of SR 144 between US 101 and the roundabout has since been relinquished (see below).

SR 144 is not part of the National Highway System, a network of highways that are considered essential to the country's economy, defense, and mobility by the Federal Highway Administration.

History
The State of California constructed the state's first modern roundabout in 1992 at the intersections of Alameda Padre Serra, Montecito Street, Salinas Street, and Sycamore Canyon Road which carried Route 144. It was called Five Points Roundabout. The roundabout cost $250,000 to construct and was designed by consulting firm, Ourston & Doctors. In 1999, the state law was changed to permit the relinquishment of Route 144 to the City of Santa Barbara. This was because the City of Santa Barbara wished to do several improvements on Milpas Street. One of these improvements includes the installation of a roundabout at the off-ramp from northbound Route 101, which Caltrans did not approve of. The roundabout controls traffic coming from Milpas Street, Carpinteria Street, and two ramps from and to Route 101. It is a significantly larger and bolder version of the Salinas Street roundabout, though the latter channels five streets. Currently, the portion from Route 101 to the Salinas traffic circle has been relinquished to the city but the portion on Sycamore Canyon remains as a state highway.

The final portion of Route 144 from Ranchito Vista Road to its junction with Route 192 had been closed off and on between 2005 and 2012 due to repetitive mudslides. In April 2012, crews completed repairs to the surrounding hillsides and reopened this segment of the highway.

Major intersections

See also

References

External links

Caltrans: Route 144 highway conditions
California Highways: Route 144
California @ AARoads.com - State Route 144

144
State Route 144
Santa Barbara, California